Soto Glacier is a glacier about 12 nautical miles (22 km) long, draining southeast along the southwest side of Strømme Ridge and discharging into Odom Inlet, on the east coast of Palmer Land. Mapped by United States Geological Survey (USGS) in 1974. Named by Advisory Committee on Antarctic Names (US-ACAN) for Luis R. Soto, Argentine oceanographer on the International Weddell Sea Oceanographic Expeditions, 1968 and 1970.

Glaciers of Palmer Land